Armidale was an electoral district of the Legislative Assembly in the Australian state of New South Wales, named after and including Armidale. It was originally created in 1894, when multi-member districts were abolished, and the three member district of New England was largely divided between Armidale, Uralla-Walcha and Bingara. In 1920, with the introduction of proportional representation, it was absorbed into Northern Tablelands, along with Gough and Tenterfield. It was recreated in 1927 and abolished in 1981 and partly replaced by the recreated Northern Tablelands.

Members for Armidale

Election results

References

Armidale
Former electoral districts of New South Wales
1894 establishments in Australia
Constituencies established in 1894
1920 disestablishments in Australia
Constituencies disestablished in 1920
1927 establishments in Australia
Constituencies established in 1927
1981 disestablishments in Australia
Constituencies disestablished in 1981